Derbyshire is a former United Kingdom Parliamentary constituency. It was a constituency of the House of Commons of the Parliament of England then of the Parliament of Great Britain from 1707 to 1800 and of the Parliament of the United Kingdom from 1801 to 1832. It was represented by two Knights of the Shire.

History

Boundaries and franchise
The constituency, which first returned members to Parliament in 1290, consisted of the historic county of Derbyshire. (This included the borough of Derby; even though Derby elected two MPs in its own right, it was not excluded from the county constituency, and owning property within the borough could confer a vote at the county election.)

In medieval times, the MPs would have been elected at the county court, by the suitors to the court, which meant the tiny handful of the local nobility who were tenants in chief of the Crown. However, from 1430, the Forty Shilling Freeholder Act extended the right to vote to every man who possessed freehold property within the county valued at £2 or more per year for the purposes of land tax; it was not necessary for the freeholder to occupy his land, nor even in later years to be resident in the county at all.

Except briefly during the period of the Commonwealth, Derbyshire had two MPs elected by the bloc vote method, under which each voter had two votes. (In the First and Second Parliaments of Oliver Cromwell's Protectorate, there was a general redistribution of seats and Derbyshire elected four members; the traditional arrangements were restored from 1659.)

Character
From Elizabethan times, elections in Derbyshire were dominated by the Cavendish family at Chatsworth, later Dukes of Devonshire. This influence was originally established by the formidable Bess of Hardwick, whose second husband was a Cavendish and who in 1572 manoeuvred to secure her son from that marriage a seat as MP for the county - a considerable honour for a young man from what was then a family of only minor importance. She had meanwhile married the 6th Earl of Shrewsbury, and her stepson, the future 7th Earl, was elected to the second seat for the county at the same time, despite being two-and-a-half years too young to take his seat. From this point onwards until the Reform Act, one of the two MPs was almost invariably a Cavendish or a Cavendish nominee, although the other seat was generally left to the other leading families of the county; the continuance of this dominance was all the more remarkable because Derbyshire did not have a rash of boroughs where the local gentry could find a seat when unable to secure election for Derbyshire - indeed, in the one borough that there was, Derby, the Dukes of Devonshire kept as tight hold on one of the two seats as they did in the county.

As in most counties of any size, contested elections were avoided whenever possible because of the expense. Elections were held at a single polling place, Derby, and voters from the rest of the county had to travel to the county town to exercise their franchise; candidates were expected to meet the expenses of their supporters in travelling to the poll and to entertain them lavishly with food and drink when they got there. There were only four general elections between 1700 and 1832 when Derbyshire's seats were contested: on every other occasion the various competing interests in the county managed to reach agreement on who should represent the county without taking the matter to a poll.

In the pre-industrial era, Derbyshire was a flourishing agricultural county, but it was one of the English counties most dramatically affected by industrialisation in the 18th and early 19th centuries, becoming noted in particular for the manufacture of heavy machinery and (during the Napoleonic Wars) of armaments. Its population grew swiftly (having reached 237,170 by 1831); but the electorate has been estimated at only 3,000 or 4,000 in the second half of the 18th century, and was probably not much higher by the time of the Reform Act. The Dukes of Devonshire were able to maintain much of their traditional influence, Cavendish members occupying one of the two seats as a Whig MP; but the county itself was predominantly Tory,  and usually ensured that the other MP was returned in that interest.

Few of the industrial workers, of course, had the vote since they were not property owners, and in the early 19th century political unrest was common - most notably the "Pentrich Revolution" or "Derbyshire Rising" of 1817. Derbyshire soon became one of the most vocal centres of agitation for Parliamentary reform, and by 1830 this sentiment had spread to the voters as well. At the 1831 election their sitting Tory MP was summarily swept out of his seat for supporting a destructive amendment to the Reform Bill.

But the Duke of Devonshire, a supporter of Reform even though it entailed the loss of his own pocket boroughs around the country, was able to retain the voters' support, telling a county meeting in 1832:
The members of the aristocracy have sometimes been considered in an unfavourable light by the people. For much of this they are indebted to the manner in which the present constitution of Parliament has enabled them to interfere and dictate in the representation... Let them stand on their own merits; and I have no fear that the people of England will be unjust to the aristocracy of England, united by mutual kind feelings and good offices, and not by close boroughs and mock representation.  

This seems to have sufficiently satisfied the Derbyshire voters that they allowed the Dukes to continue to "interfere and dictate in the representation" to the extent that they continued electing  Cavendishes (in the Northern division after the county was divided by the Reform Act) well into the 20th century.

Abolition
The constituency was abolished in 1832 by the Great Reform Act, which divided the county into two new two-member divisions, Northern Derbyshire and Southern Derbyshire.

Members of Parliament

1290–1399
 Constituency created (1290)

1400–1499

1500–1640

1640–1653

1654–1658
 Representation increased to four members in the First and Second Parliaments of the Protectorate

1659–1832
 Representation restored to two members in the Third Protectorate Parliament

Elections

Source

See also

List of former United Kingdom Parliament constituencies
Unreformed House of Commons

References

 The history of the county of Derby  By Stephen Glover
 Michael Brock, The Great Reform Act (London: Hutchinson, 1973)
 D. Brunton & D. H. Pennington, Members of the Long Parliament (London: George Allen & Unwin, 1954)
 John Cannon, Parliamentary Reform 1640–1832 (Cambridge: Cambridge University Press, 1972)
Cobbett's Parliamentary history of England, from the Norman Conquest in 1066 to the year 1803 (London: Thomas Hansard, 1808) 
 Lewis Namier & John Brooke, The History of Parliament: The House of Commons 1754–1790 (London: HMSO, 1964)
 J. E. Neale, The Elizabethan House of Commons (London: Jonathan Cape, 1949)
 T. H. B. Oldfield, The Representative History of Great Britain and Ireland (London: Baldwin, Cradock & Joy, 1816)
 J Holladay Philbin, Parliamentary Representation 1832 - England and Wales (New Haven: Yale University Press, 1965)
 Henry Stooks Smith, The Parliaments of England from 1715 to 1847 (2nd edition, edited by FWS Craig - Chichester: Parliamentary Reference Publications, 1973)

Parliamentary constituencies in Derbyshire (historic)
Constituencies of the Parliament of the United Kingdom established in 1290
Constituencies of the Parliament of the United Kingdom disestablished in 1832